Leon Searcy (born December 21, 1969) is an American football coach and former player. He currently works as a radio personality in Jacksonville, Florida.

Searcy is a former NFL offensive lineman who played primarily for the Pittsburgh Steelers and Jacksonville Jaguars in an 11-year career spanning from 1992 to 2002. He was drafted in the first-round and 11th overall by the Pittsburgh Steelers following his graduation from the University of Miami in the 1992 NFL Draft. This was the first draft pick in the post-Chuck Noll era. Beginning in 1993 (his second year), Searcy was installed at the right tackle position.  He stayed in this position until he left the team for the Jacksonville Jaguars as a free agent in 1996.

Searcy spent one season with the Baltimore Ravens in 2001 before signing with the Miami Dolphins in 2002. He tried to earn a starting position with Miami, but was ultimately placed on the injured-reserve list. After the 2002 season, he retired.

From 2004 to 2006, Searcy was the offensive line coach at Florida International University in Miami, Florida.

Searcy was interviewed about his time at the University of Miami for the documentary The U, which premiered December 12, 2009 on ESPN.

Searcy also appeared in the episode "Broke," part of ESPN's 30 for 30 series of sports documentaries discussing the high percentage of professional athletes who suffer financial problems. He gave details on an incident in which a girlfriend stole $600,000 from him.

Career highlights

Member of 1987, 1989, and 1991 University of Miami National Championship teams.
First-team All-America (Football Writers Association of America), 1991.
Second-team All-America (The Sporting News, The Football News and Associated Press), 1991.
Played in Super Bowl XXX for the Steelers.
2003 inductee of University of Miami Sports Hall of Fame.

References 

1969 births
Living people
American Conference Pro Bowl players
American football offensive linemen
Baltimore Ravens players
FIU Panthers football coaches
Jacksonville Jaguars players
Miami Dolphins players
Miami Hurricanes football players
Pittsburgh Steelers players
Players of American football from Washington, D.C.